Leptostales is a genus of moths in the family Geometridae.

Species
The genus includes the following species:

Leptostales adela (Dognin, 1890)
Leptostales adita (Prout, 1938)
Leptostales admirabilis (Oberthur, 1883)
Leptostales amechana (Dyar, 1913)
Leptostales angulata (Schaus, 1912)
Leptostales aphilotima (Prout, 1938)
Leptostales catagompha (Dyar, 1913)
Leptostales cazeca (Druce, 1892)
Leptostales concoloraria (Dognin, 1890)
Leptostales crossii (Hulst, 1900)
Leptostales damaria (Schaus, 1901)
Leptostales delectabiliaria (Moschler, 1890)
Leptostales delila (Schaus, 1912)
Leptostales desmogramma (Dyar, 1913)
Leptostales domarita (Schaus, 1940)
Leptostales exaeta (Prout, 1918)
Leptostales ferruminaria (Zeller, 1872)
Leptostales gerocoma (Dyar, 1913)
Leptostales grays (Prout, 1938)
Leptostales griseocostata (Warren, 1904)
Leptostales hegeter (Dyar, 1913)
Leptostales hepaticaria (Guenee, 1857)
Leptostales intamiataria (Moschler, 1890)
Leptostales laevitaria (Geyer, 1837)
Leptostales littoralis (Prout, 1920)
Leptostales noctuata (Guenee, 1858)
Leptostales nycteis (Druce, 1892)
Leptostales oblinataria Moschler, 1890
Leptostales olivaceata (Warren, 1901)
Leptostales oslinaria (Schaus, 1940)
Leptostales pannaria (Guenee, 1857)
Leptostales pappasaria (Dyar, 1913)
Leptostales penthemaria (Dyar, 1913)
Leptostales penumbrata (Warren, 1900)
Leptostales phorcaria (Guenee, 1858)
Leptostales phyrctaria (Dyar, 1913)
Leptostales praepeditaria Moschler, 1890
Leptostales psecasta (Prout, 1938)
Leptostales ptyctographa (Dyar, 1913)
Leptostales pulida (Dognin, 1893)
Leptostales purpurata (Warren, 1906)
Leptostales randaria (Schaus, 1940)
Leptostales rectimargo (Dyar, 1913)
Leptostales rivularia (Dyar, 1913)
Leptostales roseoliva (Warren, 1900)
Leptostales rubromarginaria (Packard, 1871)
Leptostales rubrotincta (Hulst, 1900)
Leptostales subrosea (Warren, 1905)
Leptostales subroseata (Guenee, 1858)
Leptostales subrubella (Warren, 1906)
Leptostales terminata (Guenee, 1858)
Leptostales turbata (Walker, 1863)
Leptostales uniformata (Warren, 1900)
Leptostales virgota (Schaus, 1901)
Leptostales vitticostata (Warren, 1906)

References

External links

Natural History Museum Lepidoptera genus database

Sterrhinae
Geometridae genera